The 2001 Gold Flake Open was a men's tennis tournament played on outdoor hard courts at the SDAT Tennis Stadium in Chennai in India and was part of the International Series of the 2001 ATP Tour. The tournament was held from 1 January through 7 January 2001. Unseeded Michal Tabara won the singles title.

Finals

Singles

 Michal Tabara defeated  Andrei Stoliarov 6–2, 7–6(7–4)
 It was Tabara's only title of the year and the 1st of his career.

Doubles

 Byron Black /  Wayne Black defeated  Barry Cowan /  Mosé Navarra 6–3, 6–4
 It was Byron Black's 1st title of the year and the 23rd of his career. It was Wayne Black's 1st title of the year and the 5th of his career.

References

External links
 Official website
 ATP Tournament Profile

 
Chennai Open
Chennai Open
Chennai Open